is a hotel and concert hall complex in Hakata-ku, Fukuoka, Japan. The hall has a seating capacity of 2,316, and has hosted international bands and performers such as A-ha, Gloria Estefan and Miami Sound Machine, Roxette, Rainbow, Bon Jovi, Ringo Starr, Rush, and Phil Collins.

References

External links
  

Concert halls in Japan
Buildings and structures in Fukuoka